Prince Gustaf (Swedish: Prins Gustaf) is a 1944 Swedish historical film directed by Schamyl Bauman and starring Alf Kjellin, Mai Zetterling and Lennart Bernadotte. The film portrays the life of Prince Gustav, Duke of Uppland, a member of the Nineteenth Century Swedish royal family who composed a number of celebrated songs. It was shot at the Centrumateljéerna Studios in Stockholm. The film's sets were designed by the art director Bibi Lindström.

Main cast
 Alf Kjellin as Prince Gustaf 
 Mai Zetterling as Anna Maria Wastenius 
 Lennart Bernadotte as Crown Prince Carl 
 Erik 'Bullen' Berglund as Liljegren 
 Hilda Borgström as Matilda 
 Ragnar Arvedson as Henning Hamilton 
 Carl-Axel Hallgren as Teacher 
 Folke Rydberg as Glunten 
 Gunnar Sjöberg as Carl Nyraeus 
 Rune Stylander as Björkander 
 Kolbjörn Knudsen as Oscar I 
 Anne-Marie Eek as Princess Eugenie
 Ruth Kasdan as Ida 
 Gull Natorp as Malla Silverstolpe 
 Carl Barcklind as Vicar Wastenius

References

Bibliography
 Olov Qvist, Per & von Bagh, Peter. Guide to the Cinema of Sweden and Finland.  Greenwood Publishing Group, 2000.

External links

1944 films
Swedish biographical films
Swedish historical films
Swedish black-and-white films
1940s biographical films
1940s historical films
1940s Swedish-language films
Films directed by Schamyl Bauman
Films set in the 19th century
Films about composers
1940s Swedish films